Never Make It Home is the third studio album by the American Bluegrass band Split Lip Rayfield, released in 2001 (see 2001 in music).



Track listing 
All songs written by Kirk Rundstrom except where noted.
 "Movin' To Virginia" (Gottstine)  – 2:49
 "Record Shop" – 3:41
 "Never Make It Home" (Gottstine) – 3:10
 "Thief" – 3:12
 "Love Please Come Home" (E. Jackson) – 1:30
 "Used To Call Me Baby" (Gottstine) – 3:34
 "PB24SS" – 2:49
 "Kiss of Death" (Mardis) – 4:16
 "Drink Lotsa Whiskey" – 3:58
 "Mister" – 2:21
 "River" (Gottstine) – 4:04
 "It's No Good" (Gottstine) – 3:46
 "Dime Store Cowboy" – 1:56
 "Day the Train Jumped the Tracks" (M. Carmody) – 2:15

Personnel 
 Kirk Rundstrom    -  Guitar, Vocals
 Wayne Gottstine    - Mandolin, Vocals, Harmonica
 Eric Mardis   -  Banjo, Vocals
 Jeff Eaton -  Gas Tank Bass, Vocals, Kazoo

References 

2001 albums
Split Lip Rayfield albums
Bloodshot Records albums